Bernardo Velasco (born in 30 January 1986)  is a Brazilian actor and model. He became known in Brazil for acting in "Malhação" on Rede Globo in 2011, in 2013 he acted in the soap opera "Pecado Mortal" on Record TV, A Terra Prometida, and in 2017 he was the protagonist of the soap opera "Belaventura".

Life and career

In 2004, at the age of eighteen, he was discovered by an agency scout, becoming a model, having quickly starred in several advertising campaigns and graced magazine covers. In 2008, he participated in the romantic reality show Agora Vai, in the program Mais Você, by Ana Maria Braga. In 2011 he debuted as an actor on television in the nineteenth season of the telenovela Malhação, playing the character Nando. In September 2013, he signs a contract with Rede Record and returns to TV in the telenovela Pecado Mortal, by Carlos Lombardi, in which he plays Romeu, romantic partner of actress Lua Blanco. In 2015, he was cast by Rede Record to play the character Eleazar in the soap opera Os Dez Mandamentos, acting in both seasons[9] and continuing with the same character in the plot A Terra Prometida, totaling two years between biblical soap operas. In 2017 he played the character Enrico, protagonist of the telenovela Belaventura, on RecordTV. The following year, he participated in the fourth season of the reality show Dancing Brasil, being the tenth eliminated. In 2019 he is scheduled to play the character Matheus in the macroseries Jezebel, by RecordTV.

Filmography

Awards and nominations

References

External links
 

Living people
1986 births
21st-century Brazilian male actors
People from São Paulo